Bedford Parish was created as a civil parish in Queens County, Prince Edward Island, Canada, during the 1764–1766 survey of Samuel Holland.

It contains the following townships:

 Lot 35
 Lot 36
 Lot 37
 Lot 48
 Lot 49

Parishes of Prince Edward Island
Geography of Queens County, Prince Edward Island